This is a list of Pokémon theme songs that includes the media and release information, which is Japanese and English opening and ending themes of the Pokémon anime series. They are as follows.

Japanese theme songs

Opening themes

Pocket Monsters

Pocket Monsters Advanced Generation

Pocket Monsters Diamond & Pearl

Pocket Monsters Best Wishes!

Pocket Monsters XY

Pocket Monsters Sun & Moon

Pocket Monsters (2019)

Ending themes

Pocket Monsters

Pocket Monsters Advanced Generation

Pocket Monsters Diamond & Pearl

Pocket Monsters Best Wishes!

Pocket Monsters XY

Pocket Monsters Sun & Moon

Pocket Monsters (2019)

Note: Pokémon Shiritori divided into two parts, the Pikachu → Mew Ver., (ピカチュウ→ミュウ Ver., Pikachū → Myū Ver.) JN002 – JN019, JN040 – JN070, and the Mew → Zamazenta Ver., (ミュウ→ザマゼンタ Ver., Myū → Zamazenta Ver.) JN020 – JN039, JN041 – JN069. Supereffective Type divided into two parts, the Grass Ver., (くさVer., Kusa Ver.) JN071 – present, and the Electric Ver., (でんきVer., Denki Ver.) JN072 – present.

Special themes

Pokémon Get☆TV

Weekly Pokémon Broadcasting Station

Pocket Monsters Best Wishes!

Pocket Monsters Sun & Moon

Pocket Monsters (2019)

Pocket Monsters Legends: Arceus anime

Pokémon☆Sunday

Pokémon Smash!

Meet Up at the Pokémon House?

English theme songs

Opening themes

Pokémon the Series: The Beginning and Pokémon the Series: Gold and Silver

Note: Several episodes from the original series were not aired dubbed. See Pokémon episodes removed from rotation for more details.

Pokémon the Series: Ruby and Sapphire

Pokémon the Series: Diamond and Pearl

Pokémon the Series: Black and White

Pokémon the Series: XY

Pokémon the Series: Sun and Moon

Note: None of the English opening songs from the Pokémon: Sun and Moon anime have their own full versions, just like two English opening songs from the Pokémon: Ruby and Sapphire anime did not have their own full versions. "The Challenge of Life" (instrumental) only plays during the ending credits of Episode 146.

Pokémon Journeys: The Series

Ending themes

Pokémon the Series: The Beginning and Pokémon the Series: Gold and Silver

Pokémon the Series: Ruby and Sapphire

Note: "Pokémon Theme" was used as the end credit theme song in the dub, starting from "Pokémon: Indigo League" Episode 1: Pokémon - I Choose You! to Episode 57: The Breeder Center Secret, shortened theme songs were used as the end credit theme songs in the dub, from "Pokémon: Indigo League" Episode 52: Princess vs. Princess to "Pokémon: Advanced Battle" Episode 145: Pasta la Vista, shortened instrumentals of the theme songs were used as the end credit theme songs in the dub, starting from "Pokémon: Diamond & Pearl" Episode 1: Following the Maiden's Voyage.

Special themes

Pocket Monsters Encore

Other songs

Anime soundtracks
The Pokémon anime has many soundtracks.

Pocket Monsters Sound Anime Collection: Music Collection/Famous Scene Collection

 is the licensed soundtrack from the anime. It was released by Pikachu Records on June 10, 1998, in Japan only. This collection consists of composer Shinji Miyazaki's orchestrated arrangements of musical compositions from the first four Pokémon games by composer Junichi Masuda and exclusive musical cues heard throughout the first series. These instrumental tracks are categorized as sixteen chapters included with the show's first opening theme song "Mezase Pokémon Masutā" and third ending theme song "Poketto ni Fantajī" (both are the TV-size edits). Each of the instrumental tracks are followed by a brief commentary featuring Satoshi's Pokémon Zukan voiced by its voice actor Shin-ichiro Miki explaining each composition's association with the story and at what point it plays. Included with the album is a hard bound picture book (the ), stickers, and a merchandise catalogue.

Track list

Pokémon 2.B.A. Master

Pokémon World
Pokémon World is a CD single released in the United States and Canada on February 8, 2000, by Koch Records. The first track is the theme song for Adventures on the Orange Islands, the second season of the anime. Its Koch Records catalog number is 8903.

Track list

Totally Pokémon

Totally Pokémon is the second soundtrack released for the anime. This time, it includes songs from the anime's third season, The Johto Journeys.

Track list

Pokémon Christmas Bash

Pokémon Christmas Bash is a soundtrack CD album of Pokémon-themed Christmas songs performed by cast of the 4Kids Entertainment English anime dub. It was only released in America and Germany, called "Pokémon Weihnachts Party".

Track list

Pokémon X: 10 Years of Pokémon

Pokémon X: 10 Years of Pokémon is an album released for the tenth anniversary of Pokémon. This CD consists of nine Pokémon theme songs from the first nine seasons, including several tracks from other albums. A CD sampler was released alongside the DVD release of Pokémon Ranger and the Temple of the Sea exclusively at Toys "R" Us. U.S. Target stores also released a sampler with the movie and included an exclusive bonus remix of the Hoenn Pokérap. Both samplers contained five tracks taken from Pokémon X. But sadly, Pokémon X: 10 Years of Pokémon album has been decreased tracks from 18 to 13 in 2016.

Track list

Pokémon X: Toys "R" Us sampler track list

Pokémon X: target sampler track list

Pokémon X: 2016 reissue

Pocket Monsters Original Soundtrack Best 1997–2010

Pocket Monsters Original Soundtrack Best 1997–2010 is an album that is released two weeks before the debut of Pokémon: Best Wishes! in Japan. It has all of the songs divided into two volumes.

References

External links
 List of Pokémon music CDs on Bulbapedia

 
Children's television theme songs
Animated series theme songs
theme songs
List
Lists of songs by media franchise